Irfan Peljto (born 18 July 1984) is a Bosnian professional football referee who officiates primarily in the Bosnian Premier League. He has been a FIFA referee since 2015, and is ranked as a UEFA first category referee.

Peljto is the only Bosnian referee to have officiated three UEFA Champions League group stage matches.

Refereeing career
In 2013, Peljto began officiating in the Bosnian Premier League. His first match as referee was on 27 July 2013 between Rudar Prijedor and Radnik Bijeljina. In 2015, he was put on the FIFA referees list. He officiated his first senior international match on 8 June 2019 between Belgium and Kazakhstan.

On 24 November 2021, Peljto officiated his first UEFA Champions League group stage match between Beşiktaş and Ajax, becoming the first referee from Bosnia and Herzegovina to officiate a UEFA Champions League match.

References

External links

Profile at WorldFootball.net
Profile at EU-Football.info

1984 births
Living people
Sportspeople from Sarajevo
Bosnian football referees
UEFA Europa League referees
UEFA Champions League referees